Iranian football's 3rd division is the fourth-highest football division overall in the Iranian football league system.

Before 2001, the 3rd division league was the third-highest division in Iranian football league system, however, this was changed to fourth-highest division when Iran's football structure officially became professional.

The league consists of two stages. In first stage, 65 teams participate in five groups of 13 teams each. The groups are organized in a manner such that teams closer to each other geographically end up in the same group. Because of this the 3rd division can be considered as a regional league. Stage one is played in single round-robin format and this is the only league organised by IRIFF which has no home-and-away format. Top two teams of each group promote to second stage and join to 20 teams which have already spots due to their performance in the previous season. This means 85 different teams compete in 3rd division.

See also
 IPL
 Azadegan League
 Iran Football's 2nd Division
 Iranian Super Cup
 Hazfi Cup
 Iranian Futsal Super League
 Iran Futsal's 1st Division
 Iran Futsal's 2nd Division

References

 
4
Fourth level football leagues in Asia
Professional sports leagues in Iran